Iryna Mykolayivna Suslova (born 5 August 1988 in Zhytomyr) is a Ukrainian politician. She was elected to the Verkhovna Rada in the 2014 Ukrainian parliamentary election, appearing sixth on the party list of Self Reliance. Suslova was excluded from the group in February 2015 after voting for Viktor Shokin for General Prosecutor of Ukraine. On 30 March 2016 she joined the Petro Poroshenko Bloc parliamentary faction. In 2016, Iryna was nominated on the Top 30 under 30 award by Kyiv Post.

References 

1988 births
Living people
Politicians from Zhytomyr
Eighth convocation members of the Verkhovna Rada
Self Reliance (political party) politicians
Petro Poroshenko Bloc politicians
21st-century Ukrainian politicians
21st-century Ukrainian women politicians
Women members of the Verkhovna Rada